The British Bred Produce Stakes is a greyhound racing competition held annually at Swindon Stadium.

History
It was inaugurated in 1946 at Eastville Stadium in Bristol when it was known as the Western Two-Year Old Stakes. The following year it was renamed the Western Two-Year Old Produce Stakes in order to distinguish the event as a produce event (restricted to puppies from specifically Wales and the West).

The competition was later extended to all regions but remained a puppy event. Following the closure of Bristol in 1997 it switched to sister track Swindon. The event today is open to British Bred greyhounds only. After 2019 the competition will be held on the revamped Swindon circuit.

Past winners

Venues 
1950-1997 (Bristol-Eastville) 
1998-2019 (Swindon 480m)
2020-present (Swindon 476m)

References

Greyhound racing competitions in the United Kingdom
Sport in Swindon
Recurring sporting events established in 1946
Sports competitions in Bristol